Anjelika Reznik (born 25 June 1995) is a Canadian former group rhythmic gymnast and individual athlete. She represents her nation at international competitions. Reznik made history by qualifying Canada as the 1st group ever when she participated at the 2012 Summer Olympics in London.

She won a gold medal at the 2009 Junior Pan American Games in Cuba and won a bronze medal at the 1st ever Youth Olympic Games in 2010 held in Singapore. Reznik won two silvers and a bronze medal at the 2011 Pan American Games in Mexico and two bronze medals at the 2015 Pan American Games in her hometown of Vaughan, Ontario. She also competed at world championships, including at the 2011, 2014 and 2015 World Rhythmic Gymnastics Championships.

She has joined Canada's Aesthetic Group Gymnastics team called Rhythmic Expressions. She represents Canada in World Cups, Pan American Tournaments and World Championships. Her team has won several medals internationally. She coaches and has master classes.

She has graduated from Ryerson University in 2017 majoring in political science. She is the twin sister of Victoria Reznik.

References

External links
http://olympic.ca/team-canada/anjelika-reznik/
http://www.gymcan.org/disciplines/rhythmic/national-teams/anjelika-reznik
http://www.gymnasticsontario.ca/angelika-reznik/
http://www.cjnews.com/news/sports/twin-sisters-rhythm-pan-games
http://www.bbc.com/sport/olympics/2012/athletes/ad3f941a-072f-4fd1-a68f-f333b0946e32

1995 births
Living people
Canadian rhythmic gymnasts
People from Vaughan
Sportspeople from Ontario
Sportspeople from Almaty
Olympic gymnasts of Canada
Kazakhstani emigrants to Canada
Pan American Games medalists in gymnastics
Pan American Games silver medalists for Canada
Pan American Games bronze medalists for Canada
Twin sportspeople
Canadian twins
Gymnasts at the 2012 Summer Olympics
Gymnasts at the 2010 Summer Youth Olympics
Gymnasts at the 2011 Pan American Games
Gymnasts at the 2015 Pan American Games
Medalists at the 2011 Pan American Games
Medalists at the 2015 Pan American Games